Guarani Futebol Clube, colloquially called Guarani, is a Brazilian association football club in Campinas, São Paulo. Guarani is the only club from Brazil's countryside to have won the top tier of the Brazilian Championship. The team currently play in the Série B, the second tier of Brazilian football, as well as in the Campeonato Paulista Série A1, the top tier of the São Paulo state football league.

It is also known as Bugre, a popular term for an Indigenous Brazilian, and its supporters are known as bugrinos.

History

Guarani Football Club was founded on April 1, 1911, in the city of Campinas, São Paulo, as Guarany Foot-Ball Club, by the initiative of 12 students from the Gymnasio do Estado (now Culto à Ciência). The students, including Pompeo de Vito, Hernani Felippo Matallo and Vicente Matallo, usually played football at Praça Carlos Gomes. Vicente Matallo became Guarani's first president. Guarani was named after maestro Antônio Carlos Gomes' opera "Il Guarany". Antônio Carlos Gomes was born in Campinas, Brazil, and is one of the most distinguished nineteenth century classical composers. Guarani was officially founded on April 1, 1911, but to avoid April Fools' Day jokes by supporters of rival teams, the directors of Guarani changed the official foundation date to April 2, 1911.

In 1949, Guarani won Campeonato Paulista Second tier, earning the right to play in the top tier the following season.

As of 2019, Guarani is the only Brazilian countryside team to have won the national championship (not counting Santos; although Santos is not a state capital, it is located on the coast). The club won Campeonato Brasileiro in 1978, after defeating Palmeiras.

In 1979, the club was a semi-finalist in the Copa Libertadores, but was eliminated by the eventual season champions Club Olimpia. This run remains Guarani's best performance in international competitions to date.

In 2016, Guarani qualified for the playoff semifinals of 2016 Campeonato Brasileiro Série C, thus ensuring its return to Serie B after a four-year absence.

Achievements

National 

Série A
 Winner (1): 1978
 Runners-up (2): 1986,  1987

Série B
 Winner (1): 1981
 Runners-up (2): 1991, 2009

Série C
 Runner-up (2): 2008,  2016

State 
 Campeonato Paulista
 Runners-up (2): 1988, 2012

 Campeonato Paulista Série A2
 Winner (4): 1932, 1944, 1949, 2018
 Runner-up (1): 2011

Youth team 
 Copa São Paulo de Juniores
 Winner (1): 1994

Titles timeline

1912 : Runner-up - Liga Operária de Foot-Ball Campineira
1916 : Champions - AFC (Associação de Foot-Ball Campineira)
1919 : Champions - AFC
1920 : Champions - AFC
1921 : Runner-up - APEA (Associação Paulista de Esportes Athleticos)
1926 : Champions - APEA
1928 : Runner-up - APEA
1932 : Champions - APEA
1938 : Champions - LCF (Liga Campineira de Futebol)
1939 : Champions - LCF
1941 : Champions - LCF
1942 : Champions - LCF
1943 : Champions - LCF
1943 : Runner-up - Copa do Interior (Amateur) - FPF (Federação Paulista de Futebol)
1944 : Champions - Copa do Interior (Amateur) - FPF
1944 : Champions - State Amateur Championship - FPF
1945 : Champions - LCF
1946 : Runner-up - Copa do Interior (Amateur) - FPF
1946 : Champions - LCF
1949 : Champions - Campeonato Paulista Série A2 - FPF
1953 : Champions - Torneio-Início do Campeonato Paulista - FPF
1954 : Champions - Torneio-Início do Campeonato Paulista - FPF
1956 : Champions - Torneio-Início do Campeonato Paulista - FPF
1957 : Runner-up - Torneio-Início do Campeonato Paulista - FPF
1969 : Runner-up - Torneio-Início do Campeonato Paulista - FPF
1970 : Awarded A Gazeta Esportiva 's "Taça dos Invictos"
1970 : Champions - Torneio de Classificação para 1970 (Paulistinha) - FPF
1970 : Champions - Torneio de Classificação para 1971 - FPF
1974 : Awarded "II Troféu Folha de S.Paulo" (Champions - Countryside 1972/73/74)
1976 : Champions - Campeonato Paulista First Stage (Taça Alm. Heleno Nunes)
1978 : Champions - Brazilian Championship - CBF
1981 : Champions - Taça de Prata - CBF
1982 : Runner-up - Torneio dos Campeões - CBF
1986 : Runner-up - Brazilian Championship - CBF
1987 : Runner-up - Brazilian Championship - CBF
1988 : Runner-up - Paulista Championship - FPF
1991 : Runner-up - Brazilian Championship Série B - CBF
2008 : Runner-up - Brazilian Championship Série C - CBF
2009 : Runner-up - Brazilian Championship Série B - CBF
2012 : Runner-up - São Paulo State Championship Série A1 - FPF
2016 : Runner-up - Brazilian Championship Série C - CBF
2018 : Champions - Campeonato Paulista Série A2 - FPF

Youth team titles
1994 : Copa São Paulo de Futebol Júnior
1998 : Copa Zico de Futebol Juvenil
2001 : Copa Toyota de Futebol Juvenil (disputed in Japan)
2002 : Copa Toyota de Futebol Juvenil (disputed in Japan)

Stadium

Guarani's stadium is Estádio Brinco de Ouro da Princesa, built on May 31, 1953, with a maximum capacity of 30,988 people.

Rival
Guarani's biggest rival is Ponte Preta, who also hail from Campinas. The games between Guarani and Ponte Preta are known as Derby  Campineiro.

Performances in the Série A

Current squad

First-team staff

Guarani players in the World Cup
The following footballers, who have played for Guarani at some point during their careers, represented Brazil in the FIFA World Cup:

 1974 FIFA World Cup (West Germany)
Valdir Peres

 1978 FIFA World Cup (Argentina)
Amaral
Carlos
Jorge Mendonça
Valdir Peres

 1982 FIFA World Cup (Spain)
Carlos
Paulo Isidoro
Renato
Valdir Peres

 1986 FIFA World Cup (Mexico)
Careca
Carlos
Edson
Júlio César

 1990 FIFA World Cup (Italy)
Careca
Ricardo Rocha

 1994 FIFA World Cup (United States)
Mauro Silva
Ricardo Rocha
Viola
Zetti

  2002 FIFA World Cup (South Korea/Japan)
Edílson
Luizão

 2006 FIFA World Cup (Germany)
Mineiro

Presidents

 Vicente Matallo (1911-12)
 Vicente Matallo - Pompeo de Vito / Mário Branco de Godoy (1913)
 Antonio de Souza Letro / Pompeo de Vito (1914)
 Pompeo de Vito (1915-17)
 Armando Sarnes / Pompeo de Vito (1918)
 Júlio dos Santos Mota / Antonio Alberti / Carmine Alberti (1919)
 Carmine Alberti (1920-21)
 Antonio Albino Júnior (1922-23)
 José de Queiroz Telles (1924)
 Galdino de Moraes Alves / José Ferreira de Godoy (1925)
 Dr. Lucio Pereira Peixoto / Benedicto da Cunha Campos (1926)
 Benedicto da Cunha Campos (1927)
 Wlademir Varanda / Ítalo Franceschini (1928)
 Augusto de Carvalho Asbahr (1929)
 Dr. Romeu Tórtima / Dr. Arnaldo de Campos (1930)
 Alexandre Chiarini (1931)
 Frederico Borghi (1932)
 Dr. Romeu Tórtima (1933)
 Augusto de Carvalho Asbahr (1934)
 João Mezzalira (1935-36)
 Vicente Torregrossa (1937)
 Dr. Januário Pardo Mêo (1938-39)
 Prof. Floriano de Azevedo Marques (1939-40)
 Dr. Sebastião Otranto (1941)
 Jaime Serra / João Mezzalira (1942)
 Alfredo Ribeiro Nogueira (1943)
 Cesar Contessotto (1944)
 Cesar Contessotto / Guilmer Cury Zakia (1945)
 Artemiro Caruzo Andreoli (1946)
 Sebastião Otranto - Emílio Porto (1947)
 Dr. Romeu Tórtima (1948)
 Nilo de Rezende Rubim / Cesar Contessotto (1949)
 Cesar Contessotto / Dr. Romeu Tórtima (1950)
 Isolino Ferramola (1951)
 Dr. Romeu Tórtima (1952)
 Dr. Rui Vicente de Mello / Cesar Contessoto (1953)
 Dolor de Oliveira Barbosa (1954)
 Miguel Moreno (1955)
 Esmeraldino Antunes Barreira (1956)
 Emílio Porto (1957)
 Jaime Silva (1958)
 Mário Brocchi (1959)
 Jaime Silva (1960-62)
 Jamil Gadia (1963)
 Jaime Silva (1964)
 Miguel Moreno (1965)
 Eder Guimarães Leme / João Motta (1966)
 Jaime Silva / Manoel Marques Paiva / Eduardo José Farah (1967)
 Miguel Moreno (1968-69)
 Leonel Almeida Martins de Oliveira (1970), (1977)
 Ricardo Chuffi (1978-79)
 Antonio Tavares Jr. (1980-83)
 Leonel Almeida Martins de Oliveira (1984-87)
 Luiz Roberto Zini (1988-91)
 Luiz Roberto Zini (1992-99)
 José Luiz Lourencetti (1999-06)
 Leonel Almeida Martins de Oliveira (2006-11)
 Marcelo Mingone  (2011-2012)
 Alvaro Negrão de Lima  (2012-2014)
 Horley Senna (2014-2017)
 Palmeron Mendes Filho (2017-2019)
 Ricardo Miguel Moisés (2019-to-date)

Records

Ultras
Torcida Fúria Independente
Guerreiros da Tribo
Torcida Jovem
Bugrinos da Capital

References

External links
  

 
Football clubs in São Paulo (state)
Association football clubs established in 1911
1911 establishments in Brazil
Campeonato Brasileiro Série A winning clubs